Philipp II of Hanau-Lichtenberg (born 31 May 1462 in Hanau; died: 22 August 1504 in Babenhausen) ruled the County of Hanau-Lichtenberg from 1480 until his death.

Early life 
Philipp II was born on 31 May 1462 between 21:00 and 22:00, as the second son of the Count Philipp I, the Elder of Hanau-Babenhausen and his wife, Anna of Lichtenberg. He was baptized three days after the birth, in the St. Mary's Church in Hanau. His godparents were Konrad Brelle, abbot of Selbold Abbey, Wenceslaus of Cleves and Meze of Gemmingen, the widow of Eber-hard Waißen.

His older brother, Johann, died young, so that Philipp succeeded his father as Count of Hanau-Babenhausen.

Family

Marriage and issue 
He married on 9 September 1480 with Anna of Isenburg-Büdingen (d. 1522). A papal dispensation had been necessary for this marriage because they were related to each other in the fourth degree. They had the following children:
 Philipp III (18 October 1482 – 15 May 1538).
 Anna (1485 – 11 October 1559), a nun in the Marienborn Abbey
 Margaret (1486 – 6 August 1560 in Babenhausen), also nun in the Marienborn Abbey, interned for life at Babenhausen Castle, because of a "slip". She was buried in the St. Nikolaus church in Babenhausen.
 Ludwig (born: 5 October 1487 in Buchsweiler; died: 3 December 1553 in Willstätt; buried in the St. Adelphi church in Neuweiler), unmarried clergyman
 Maria (died: probably 1526), abbess of Klarenthal Abbey from 1512 to 1525
 Amalia (born: 7 June 1490 in Buchsweiler; died 11 March 1552 in Pfaffenhoffen; buried in the St. Adelphi church in Neuweiler), a nun
 Reinhard (born: 19 February 1494 in Klingenberg am Main; died in Buchsweiler; buried in the St. Adelphi in Neuweiler), joined the clergy

Ancestors

References
 M. Goltzené: Aus der Geschichte des Amtes Buchsweiler, in: Pay d’Alsace, vol. 111/112, p. 64 ff
 Hatstein, hand-written chronicle in the archives of the Hanauer Geschichtsverein
 E. Haug: Groß-Arnsburg bei Baerental, in: Wasgaublick, vol. 19, issue 10, 1991, p. 364-419.
 Bernhard Herzog: Chronicon Alsatiae. Elsasser Chronick unnd außführliche beschreibung des unteren Elsasses am Rheinstrom, Strasbourg, 1592
 J. G. Lehmann: Urkundliche Geschichte der Grafschaft Hanau-Lichtenberg im unteren Elsasse, two vols., 1862, reprinted: Pirmasens, 1970
 Eckhard Meise: Bernhard Hundeshagen - kein Denkmalschutz im Hanau des frühen 19. Jahrhunderts, in: Neues Magazin für Hanauische Geschichte, 2006, p. 3-62.
 Wilhelm Morhardt: Hanau alt's - in Ehren b'halt's - Die Grafen von Hanau-Lichtenberg in Geschichte und Geschichten = Babenhausen einst und jetzt, vol. 10, Babenhausen, 1984
 Reinhold Röhricht and Heinrich Meisner: Deutsche Pilgerreisen nach dem Heiligen Lande, Berlin, 1880
 Sebastian Scholz: Die Inschriften der Stadt Darmstadt und des Landkreises Darmstadt-Dieburg und Groß-Gerau = Die deutschen Inschriften vol. 49, series Mainze, vol. 6. ed. by Akademie der Wissenschaften Mainz, Wiesbaden, 1999
 Reinhard Suchier: Genealogie des Hanauer Grafenhauses, in: Festschrift des Hanauer Geschichtsvereins zu seiner fünfzigjährigen Jubelfeier am 27. August 1894, Hanau, 1894
 Georg Wittenberger: Stadtlexikon Babenhausen, Babenhausen, 1995
 Ernst J. Zimmermann: Hanau Stadt und Land, 3rd ed., Hanau 1919, reprinted: 1978

Footnotes 

1462 births
1504 deaths
15th-century German people
Counts of Hanau-Lichtenberg